Esther Vergeer and Sharon Walraven defeated the defending champion Aniek van Koot and her partner Jiske Griffioen in the final, 5–7, 6–4, [10–5] to win the women's doubles wheelchair tennis title at the 2011 French Open. It was their second step towards an eventual Grand Slam, and Walraven completed the career Super Slam with the win.

Daniela Di Toro and van Koot were the reigning champions, but Di Toro chose not to compete this year.

Seeds
 Esther Vergeer /  Sharon Walraven (champions)
 Jiske Griffioen /  Aniek van Koot (final)

Draw

Finals

References
Main Draw

Wheelchair Women's Doubles
French Open, 2011 Women's Doubles